"Over the Hills and Far Away" is a traditional British song, dating back to at least the late 17th century. One version was published in Thomas D'Urfey's Wit and Mirth, or Pills to Purge Melancholy; a very different one appeared in George Farquhar's 1706 play The Recruiting Officer. A version also appears in John Gay's The Beggar's Opera of 1728.

The words have changed over the years, as can be seen in the versions below. The only consistent element in early versions is the title line and the tune. D'Urfey's and Gay's versions both refer to lovers, while Farquhar's version refers to fleeing overseas to join the army. The tune was provided with another set of lyrics for the British Sharpe television series of the 1990s, based on Farquhar's version. This version was also recorded by John Tams who played Dan Hagman in the series.

The nursery rhyme "Tom, Tom, the Piper's Son" mentions a piper who knows only one tune, this one.  Early versions of this, known as "The distracted Jockey's Lamentations", may have been written (but not included) in Thomas D'Urfey's play The Campaigners (1698):

Tommy was a Piper's Son, 
And fell in love when he was young; 
But all the Tunes that he could play, 
Was, o'er the Hills, and far away.

Another nursery rhyme, "Five Little Ducks", uses the title of the song as a line.

An instrumental version was heard in the Barney & Friends episode "Classical Cleanup".

D'Urfey lyrics
Jocky met with Jenny fair
Aft by the dawning of the day;
But Jockey now is fu' of care
Since Jenny staw his heart away.
Altho' she promis'd to be true
She proven has, alake! unkind
Which gars poor Jockey aften rue
That e'er he loo'd a fickle mind.

Tis o'er the hills and far away
Tis o'er the hills and far away
Tis o'er the hills and far away
The wind has blown my plaid away

[verses omitted]

Since that she will nae pity take
I maun gae wander for her sake
And, in ilk wood and gloomy grove
I'll, sighing, sing, "Adieu to love.
Since she is fause whom I adore
I'll never trust a woman more;
Frae a' their charms I'll flee away
And on my pipes I'll sweetly play,"

O'er hills and dales and far away
O'er hills and dales and far away
O'er hills and dales and far away
The wind has blawn my plad away.

George Farquhar lyrics
A version of the lyrics by George Farquhar for his play The Recruiting Officer from 1706.

Our 'prentice Tom may now refuse
To wipe his scoundrel Master's Shoes,
For now he's free to sing and play
Over the Hills and far away.
Over the Hills and O'er the Main,
To Flanders, Portugal and Spain,
The queen commands and we'll obey
Over the Hills and far away.

We all shall lead more happy lives
By getting rid of brats and wives
That scold and brawl both night and day –
Over the Hills and far away.
Over the Hills and O'er the Main,
To Flanders, Portugal and Spain,
The queen commands and we'll obey
Over the Hills and far away.

Courage, boys, 'tis one to ten,
But we return all gentlemen
While conquering colours we display,
Over the hills and far away.
Over the Hills and O'er the Main,
To Flanders, Portugal and Spain,
The queen commands and we'll obey
Over the Hills and far away.

John Gay lyrics
In The Beggar's Opera the song is a duet between the antihero Macheath and his lover Polly. It is a romantic dream of escape, with no military references.

MACHEATH:
Were I laid on Greenland's Coast,
And in my Arms embrac'd my Lass;
Warm amidst eternal Frost,
Too soon the Half Year's Night would pass.

POLLY:
Were I sold on Indian Soil,
Soon as the burning Day was clos'd,
I could mock the sultry Toil
When on my Charmer's Breast repos'd.
 
MACHEATH: 
And I would love you all the Day,

POLLY:
Every Night would kiss and play,

MACHEATH: 
If with me you'd fondly stray

POLLY: 
Over the Hills and far away

John Tams lyrics
This is the version that is used in the Sharpe television series with lyrics written by John Tams. Note that each verse is from a different story, as noted at the start of the verse.

Chorus:
O'er the hills and o'er the main
Through Flanders, Portugal and Spain.
King George commands and we obey
Over the hills and far away.

From Sharpe's Eagle & Sharpe's Mission:
Here's forty shillings on the drum
To those who volunteer to come,
To 'list and fight the foe today
Over the Hills and far away.

From Sharpe's Company:
Through smoke and fire and shot and shell,
And to the very walls of hell,
But we shall stand and we shall stay
Over the hills and far away

From Sharpe's Enemy:
Though I may travel far from Spain
A part of me shall still remain,
And you are with me night and day
and Over the hills and far away.

From Sharpe's Honour & Sharpe's Siege:
Then fall in lads behind the drum
With colours blazing like the sun.
Along the road to come what may
Over the hills and far away.

From Sharpe's Gold:
When Evil stalks upon the land
I'll neither hold nor stay me hand
But fight to win a better day,
Over the hills and far away.

From Sharpe's Battle:
If I should fall to rise no more,
As many comrades did before,
Ask the fifes and drums to play
Over the hills and far away.

From Sharpe's Sword:
Let kings and tyrants come and go,
I'll stand adjudged by what I know.
A soldiers life I'll ne'er gainsay.
Over the hills and far away.

From Sharpe's Challenge:
Though kings and tyrants come and go
A soldier's life is all I know
I'll live to fight another day
Over the hills and far away.

No version of the song accompanies Sharpe's Rifles, Sharpe's Regiment, Sharpe's Revenge and Sharpe's Justice.  A tongue-in-cheek verse appears in Sharpe's Waterloo:

Old Wellington, he scratched his bum.
He says, "Boney lad, thee's had thee fun."
My riflemen will win the day
Over the hills and far away.

Dan Hagman quietly sings the first verse to Perkins when he was dying from getting bayoneted by a Spanish-Irish traitor, O'Rourke, in Sharpe's Battle, and Sharpe himself recites the same verse to the dying Ensign Beauclere in Sharpe's Peril.

Tams's recorded version
Tams recorded a variation of the above lyrics for Over the Hills & Far Away: The Music of Sharpe, the companion CD to the television film series. The song was also recorded by New Zealand singer Will Martin on his debut 2008 album New World. The lyrics for that version go as follows. (Chorus lyrics located at bottom of page)

Here's forty shillings on the drum
For those who volunteer to come,
To 'list and fight the foe today
Over the Hills and far away

[Chorus]

When duty calls me I must go
To stand and face another foe
But part of me will always stray
Over the hills and far away

[Chorus]

If I should fall to rise no more
As many comrades did before
Then ask the fifes and drums to play
Over the hills and far away

[Chorus]

Then fall in lads behind the drum
With colours blazing like the sun
Along the road to come what may
Over the hills and far away

[Chorus] 3x

[Chorus]: O'er the hills and o'er the main
Through Flanders, Portugal and Spain
King George commands and we obey
Over the hills and far away

See also
Over the Hills & Far Away: The Music of Sharpe

References

Further reading

British patriotic songs
English folk songs
Sharpe series
Canadian military marches
17th-century songs
18th-century songs
Songs about soldiers